Erythronium sibiricum is a bulbous perennial plant in the lily family Liliaceae, commonly known as the Siberian fawn lily or Siberian trout lily.

Traits 
The two basal leaves are often covered with spots. The perigones are between 25 and 70 millimeters long and of a pinkish purple, sometimes white, coloration with a yellow base. The anthers are yellow. Flowering is at the end of April or beginning of May. The number of chromosomes is 2n = 24.

Distribution 
Erythronium sibiricum occurs in Siberia (Altay, Tuva, Krasnoyarsk), in Northeastern Kazakhstan and in Northern Xinjiang and Mongolia in the Altai and Sajan mountains. The species inhabits forests, thickets and subalpine meadows at altitudes of 1100 to 2500 meters.

Systematics 
This species was first described in 1841 by Friedrich von Fischer and Carl Anton von Meyer as Erythronium dens-canis var. sibiricum. In 1929 Porphyry Nikitic Krylov gave it the species status.

References

External links

sibiricum
Flora of Siberia
Flora of Mongolia
Flora of Xinjiang
Flora of Russia
Flora of China
Flora of Kazakhstan
Plants described in 1841